Panzhou is a county-level city in southwestern Guizhou province, China, on the border with Yunnan province to the west. It is under the administration of the prefecture-level city of Liupanshui.

Administrative divisions
As of 2017, Panzhou is divided into fourteen towns, seven townships, and six subdistricts.

Geography
Panzhou is located in western Guizhou province and southwestern Liupanshui. Panzhou shares a border with Fuyuan County and Xuanwei to the west, Pu'an County to the east, Shuicheng District to the north, and  Xingyi to the south.

Geology
Panzhou is located in the South China Karst, with mostly on a mountain plateau. The terrain elevation is high in the northwest, low in the southeast, and uplifted in the center and south.

Climate
Panzhou has a humid subtropical climate with monsoon influence. Winters are mild and summers are cool.

Economy
Panzhou is one of the most developed counties in Guizhou; it ranked the 84th in the Top100 of counties and county-level citities of China by comprehensive strength in 2020.

Demographics

Population
As of the 2019 census, there were 1,305,666 people and 446,784 households residing in Panzhou. There are 1,070,700 permanent residents in the city. There are 29 ethnic groups living in Panzhou. Among the 28 ethnic minorities, 6 are local minorities, including 126,000 Yi, 38,000 Bai, 33,000 Miao, 22,000 Bouyei, 9,500 Hui and 6,500 Sui, accounting for 20.83% of the total population. There are 15,000 people in the other 22 minorities, including Mongolians, Manchu, Tujia, Dong, Gelao and Zhuang.

Language
Mandarin is the official language. The local people speak both Southwestern Mandarin and minority languages.

Religion
The county government supports all religions. The local people mainly believe in Chinese folk religion, Buddhism, Taoism and Catholicism. There are twenty Buddhist temples, one Taoist temple, three Islamic mosques, one Catholic church and seven Protestant churches in Panzhou.

Culture and tourism
There are two national 4A scenic areas in Panzhou: the Tuole Ancient Ginkgo Scenic Area and the Dala Fairy Valley Scenic Area. There are also three provincial tourist resorts and three provincial tourist scenic spots. The Pan County Dadong Ancient Cultural Site is the only national relic protection unit in Panzhou. There are five provincial culture and relics sites, including the Pan'anzhou Confucius Temple, the City God Temple, and the former residence of Zhang Daofan (Chang Tao-fan). The Wumeng Prairie Scenic Area is a famous scenic area in all of Guizhou.

Major Buddhist Temples in Panzhou include Guanyin Temple and Huguo Temple (or Protect the Country Temple).

Parks
Panzhou has two major public parks: the East Lake Park and the South Lake Park.

Transportation
The city has one high-speed railway station, Panzhou, on the Shanghai–Kunming line. There are several conventional railway stations in the City on three lines: the Panxi railway, Liupanshui–Hongguo railway, and the Weishe–Hongguo railway. These three lines meet at Hongguo railway station in Hongguo Subdistrict.

Notable people
 Long Zhaoxi, a Tusi in the Yuan dynasty.
 Shao Yuanshan, Ming dynasty politician.
 Jiang Zonglu, Ming dynasty politician.
 Wang Zuoyuan, Ming dynasty politician.
 Meng Benchun, Ming dynasty military officer.
 Zhang Lingxiang, Muslim uprising leader.
 Ma Hetu, Muslim uprising leader.
Chang Tao-fan, politician in the Republic of China who served as President of the Legislative Yuan between 1952 and 1961.

References

External links

 
County-level divisions of Guizhou
Liupanshui